Mount Taylor is a  mountain summit located in the Coast Mountains, in Joffre Lakes Provincial Park, in southwestern British Columbia, Canada. It is part of the Joffre Group, which is a subset of the Lillooet Ranges. Its nearest higher peak is Slalok Mountain,  to the east. Precipitation runoff from the peak drains into Joffre Creek, a tributary of the Lillooet River. The mountain's name was submitted by Karl Ricker of the Alpine Club of Canada to honor Ada C. Taylor, a Pemberton pioneer and the first nurse in that community. The name was officially adopted January 23, 1979, by the Geographical Names Board of Canada.

Climate
Based on the Köppen climate classification, Mount Taylor is located in a subarctic climate zone of western North America. Most weather fronts originate in the Pacific Ocean, and travel east toward the Coast Mountains where they are forced upward by the range (Orographic lift), causing them to drop their moisture in the form of rain or snowfall. As a result, the Coast Mountains experience high precipitation, especially during the winter months in the form of snowfall. Temperatures can drop below −20 °C with wind chill factors below −30 °C. The months July through September offer the most favorable weather for climbing Mount Taylor.

See also

 Geography of British Columbia
 Geology of British Columbia

References

Gallery

External links
 Weather: Mountain Forecast
 Ada Taylor photos: Pemberton Museum
 Climbing Mount Taylor in winter: YouTube

Two-thousanders of British Columbia
Lillooet Ranges